Conleith "Deets" Gilligan (born 17 December 1979) is a Gaelic footballer who played for the Derry county team, with whom he won two National League titles.

Gilligan plays his club football for Ballinderry Shamrocks. He was instrumental in helping Ballinderry win the 2002 All-Ireland Senior Club Football Championship, and he has also won four Derry Championships and an Ulster Senior Club Football Championship with the club.

Gilligan usually plays as a playmaker in the forward line and his vision and ability to pick out pin-point passes is well renowned.

Playing career

Inter-county
Gilligan was a late addition to the Derry panel that won the 2000 National League. He joined the panel after the NFL final against Meath, which finished a draw and came on as a substitute in the final replay.

He was instrumental in the 2008 National League, which Derry won, defeating Kerry in the final.

He announced his retirement from inter-county football in November 2012.

Club
Gilligan won his first Derry Senior Football Championship in 2001 and Ballinderry went on to win that year's Ulster Senior Club Football Championship, and the All-Ireland Senior Club Football Championship the following March. He has won further Derry Championship medals with the club in 2002, 2006 (as captain) and 2008. He has also won seven Derry Senior League medals with the club (1995, 1996, 1997, 2005, 2006, 2007 and 2008).

Honours

Inter-county
National Football League:
Winner (2): 2000, 2008
Dr McKenna Cup:
Runner up: 2005, more?

Club
All-Ireland Senior Club Football Championship:
Winner (1): 2002
All-Ireland Kilmacud Crokes Sevens Championship:
Winner (1): 1998
Runner up: 1999??
Ulster Senior Club Football Championship:
Winner (1): 2001
Runner up: 2006, 2008
Ulster Senior Club Football League:
Winner (1): 2008
Derry Senior Football Championship:
Winner (4): 2001, 2002, 2006, 2008
Runner up: 1999, 2000, 2003
Derry Senior Football League:
Winner (7): 1995, 1996, 1997, 2005, 2006, 2007, 2008
Numerous underage competitions

Individual
Derry Senior Football Championship winning captain: 2006

Note: The above lists may be incomplete. Please add any other honours you know of.

References

External links
Player profiles on Official Derry GAA website
Ballinderry Shamrocks GAC

1979 births
Living people
Ballinderry Gaelic footballers
Derry inter-county Gaelic footballers